Falling Water is a census-designated place and unincorporated community in Hamilton County, Tennessee, United States. Its population was 1,232 as of the 2010 census.

Demographics

References

Census-designated places in Hamilton County, Tennessee
Census-designated places in Tennessee
Unincorporated communities in Tennessee